Iron(III) sulfate (or ferric sulfate), is a family of inorganic compounds with the formula Fe2(SO4)3(H2O)n. A variety of hydrates are known, including the most commonly encountered form of "ferric sulfate".  Solutions are used in dyeing as a mordant, and as a coagulant for industrial wastes. Solutions of ferric sulfate are also used in the processing of aluminum and steel.

Speciation
The various crystalline forms of Fe2(SO4)3(H2O)n are well-defined, often by X-ray crystallography.  The nature of the aqueous solutions is often less certain, but aquo-hydroxo complexes such as [Fe(H2O)6]3+ and [Fe(H2O)5(OH)]2+ are often assumed.  Regardless, all such solids and solutions feature ferric ions, each with five unpaired electrons.  By virtue of this high spin d5 electronic configuration, these ions are paramagnetic and are weak chromophores.

Production
Ferric sulfate solutions are usually generated from iron wastes. The actual identity of the iron species is often vague, but many applications do not demand high purity materials.  It is produced on a large scale by treating sulfuric acid, a hot solution of ferrous sulfate, and an oxidizing agent.  Typical oxidizing agents include chlorine, nitric acid, and hydrogen peroxide.
2 FeSO4  +  H2SO4 + H2O2 →  Fe2(SO4)3 + 2 H2O

Natural occurrences
Iron sulfates occur as a variety of rare (commercially unimportant) minerals. Mikasaite, a mixed iron-aluminium sulfate of chemical formula (Fe3+, Al3+)2(SO4)3 is the name of mineralogical form of iron(III) sulfate. This anhydrous form occurs very rarely and is connected with coal fires. The hydrates are more common, with coquimbite (nonahydrate) as probably the most often met among them. Paracoquimbite is the other, rarely encountered natural nonahydrate. Kornelite (heptahydrate) and quenstedtite (decahydrate) are rarely found. Andradite garnet is a yellow-green example found in Italy. Lausenite (hexa- or pentahydrate) is a doubtful species. All the mentioned natural hydrates are unstable connected with the weathering (aerobic oxidation) of Fe-bearing primary minerals (mainly pyrite and marcasite).

See also
 Iron(II) sulfate or ferrous sulfate
 Ammonium iron(II) sulfate
 Ammonium iron(III) sulfate

References

External links
Material Safety Data Sheet

Iron(III) compounds
Sulfates